St. Gregorios College, Kottarakkara, is a general degree college located in Kottarakkara, Kollam district, Kerala in India. It was established in the year 1964. The college is affiliated with Kerala University. This college offers different courses in arts, commerce, and science.

Departments

Science
Physics
Chemistry
Mathematics
Statistics
Botany
Zoology

Arts and Commerce
Malayalam
English
Hindi
Syriac
History
Political Science
Economics
Physical Education
Commerce

Accreditation
The college is recognized by the University Grants Commission (UGC).

Notable alumni
 Chittayam Gopakumar, Deputy Speaker, Kerala Legislative Assembly

References

External links
http://www.gregorioscollege.org

Universities and colleges in Kollam district
Educational institutions established in 1964
1964 establishments in Kerala
Arts and Science colleges in Kerala
Colleges affiliated to the University of Kerala